This is a list of the designated National Wild and Scenic Rivers in the United States. Each river has been designated by Congress, or, if certain requirements were met, the Secretary of the Interior. A designation may include multiple watercourses; for example, the Saint Croix National Scenic Riverway includes the Namekagon River as well as the St. Croix River.

Rivers are managed by one or more federal, state, local government agencies. Only federal agencies are listed in this table. Abbreviations used are:
USACE = U.S. Army Corps of Engineers
BLM = Bureau of Land Management
NPS = National Park Service
USFS = United States Forest Service
USFWS = United States Fish and Wildlife Service

Gallery

References

Wild and Scenic Rivers by State, Interagency Wild and Scenic Rivers Coordinating Council

External links
 National Wild and Scenic Rivers System

 
Wild and Scenic Rivers
Wild and Scenic